K-1 Grand Prix '96 was a kickboxing event promoted by the K-1 organization. It was the fourth K-1 World Grand Prix final involving eight of the world's best heavyweight fighters (+95 kg/209 lbs), with all bouts fought under K-1 Rules. The eight finalists had all almost qualified via elimination fights at the K-1 Grand Prix '96 Opening Battle event. The only absentee was Stan Longinidis who was unable to participate in the tournament due to injury - he was replaced by reservist Duane Van Der Merwe. As well as tournament bouts there were also two 'Super Fights' fought under K-1 Rules. In total there were twelve fighters at the event, representing seven countries.

The tournament winner was Andy Hug who defeated Mike Bernardo in the final by way of second round knockout. This would be the popular Hug's first and sole K-1 World Grand Prix title, although he would be the runner up in two more finals. Mike Bernardo would be taking place in his first and only K-1 final, causing a considerable upset by defeating defending champion Peter Aerts by knockout in the quarter finals. The event was held at the Yokohama Arena in Yokohama, Japan on Monday, May 6, 1996 in front of 17,850 spectators.

K-1 Grand Prix '96 Tournament

* Reserve Fight winner Duane Van Der Merwe replaced Stan Longinidis in the Quarter Finals as Stan Longinidis was injured

Results

See also
List of K-1 events
List of male kickboxers

References

External links
K-1sport.de - Your Source for Everything K-1
K-1 Official Website

K-1 events
1996 in kickboxing
Kickboxing in Japan
Sport in Yokohama